Since 1975, the Goslarer Kaiserring award has been given, by the city of Goslar, to a distinguished international artist of modern and contemporary art. The award is for artists whose work has given the contemporary art significant impetus. The prize consists of an aquamarine set in gold, in which the seal of Henry IV, Holy Roman Emperor (1050–1106) is engraved. It is made every year by the goldsmith Hadfried Rinke from Worpswede.

Recipients
Source:

 1975: Henry Moore
 1976: Max Ernst
 1977: Alexander Calder
 1978: Victor Vasarely
 1979: Joseph Beuys
 1980: Jean Tinguely (acceptance refused)
 1981: Richard Serra
 1982: Max Bill
 1983: Günther Uecker
 1984: Willem de Kooning
 1985: Eduardo Chillida
 1986: Georg Baselitz
 1987: Christo
 1988: Gerhard Richter
 1989: Mario Merz
 1990: Anselm Kiefer
 1991: Nam June Paik
 1992: Rebecca Horn
 1993: Roman Opalka
 1994: Bernd and Hilla Becher
 1995: Cy Twombly
 1996: Dani Karavan
 1997: Franz Gertsch
 1998: Ilya Kabakov
 1999: Cindy Sherman
 2000: Sigmar Polke
 2001: Christian Boltanski
 2002: Jenny Holzer
 2003: William Kentridge
 2004: Katharina Sieverding
 2005: Robert Longo
 2006: Jörg Immendorff
 2007: Matthew Barney
 2008: Andreas Gursky
 2009: Bridget Riley
 2010: David Lynch
 2011: Rosemarie Trockel
 2012: John Baldessari
 2013: Ólafur Elíasson
 2014: Wiebke Siem
 2015: Boris Mikhailov
 2016: Jimmie Durham
 2017: Isa Genzken
 2018: Wolfgang Tillmans
 2019: Barbara Kruger
 2020: Hans Haacke
 2021: Adrian Piper
 2022: Isaac Julien

References

External links
 

German art awards
Awards established in 1975